Thomas Thurlow may refer to:

Thomas Thurlow (bishop) (1737–1791), English bishop
Thomas Thurlow (sculptor) (1813–1899), English sculptor
Tom Thurlow (born 1989), English businessman